There are many geographically indicated foods of the United Kingdom. In British cuisine, there is a custom of naming foodstuffs with reference to their place of origin. However, there are other reasons for this practice; Scotch egg, which was invented in London and Dover sole which indicates where they were landed, for example.

A number of such foods have been granted Protected Geographical Status under European Union law (see List of United Kingdom food and drink products with protected status).

A 
 Aberdeen roll 

 Allerdale Cheese
 Angus burger
 Arbroath smokie

B 
 Bakewell pudding
 Bakewell tart
 Banbury apple pie
 Banbury cake
 Barkham Blue and Barkham Chase (cheeses) 
 Bath blue (cheese) 
 Bath bun
 Bath chap
 Bath Oliver biscuit
 Bedfordshire clanger (pastry)
 Belvoir Castle buns
 Berkshire jugged steak
 Berwick cockle (sweet/candy)
 Blenheim Orange (apple)
 Blue Wensleydale (cheese) 
 Bonchester cheese
 (Scottish) Border tart
 Borrowdale teabread
 Bowland cheese (Forest of)
 Branston pickle
 Brown Windsor soup
 Buxton Blue cheese

C 
 Caerphilly cheese
 Cheddar cheese
 Chelsea bun
 Cheshire cheese
 Cheshire soup
 Coleraine cheddar
 Colchester Native Oysters
 Chorley cake
 Cornish clotted cream
 Cornish fairings (biscuits/cookies)
 Cornish Gilliflower (apple)
 Cornish pasty
 Cornish sardines
 Cornish Yarg (cheese)
 Craster kippers
 Cullen skink (soup)
 Cumberland currant and apple pasties
 Cumberland pie
 Cumberland sand cake
 Cumberland spare rib pie and sweet lamb pie
 Cumberland sausage
 Cumberland sauce

D 
 Derbyshire fruit loaf
 Derbyshire medley pie
 Derbyshire oatcakes
 Devonshire mullet pie, onion pie, and pork pie
 Devonshire squab pie
 Durham rabbit pot pie
 Devonshire splits
 Devonshire clotted cream 
 Dorset Blue Vinney cheese
 Dorset Drum (cheese)
 Dorset fair gingerbread, luxury applecake, rough cake, and tea bread
 Double Gloucester (cheese)
 Dovedale cheese
 Dundee cake
 Dunlop cheese
 Dunsyre Blue (cheese)

E 
 Eccles cake
 Essex meat layer pudding
 Essex Pippin (apple)
 Eton mess (dessert)

F 
 Fine Fettle Yorkshire Cheese
 Finnan haddie (Findon or Findhorn) fish
 Five Counties cheese 
 Flower of Kent (apple)
 Forfar bridie (pasty)

G 
 Grasmere gingerbread
 Glamorgan sausage
 Gloucester cheese stew
 Gloucester pancakes
 Goosnargh cake
 Glory of York
 Grimsby smoked fish

H 
 Hampshire haslet (meatloaf)
 Harwich Kitchels (pastries)
 Hawick Balls (sweets/candy)
 Hereford apple dumplings
 Hereford Hop

I 
 Ipswich almond pudding
 Ipswich lemon pie
 Isle of Wight doughnuts

J 
 Jethart snails
 Jersey Royal potato

K 
 Kendal mint cake (candy)
 Kentish cheese and apple pie
 Kelvedon Wonder Pea
 Kirriemuir Ginger Bread

L 
 Lanark Blue (cheese)
 Lancashire cheese
 (Lancashire) Hindle Wakes (chicken dish)
 Lancashire hotpot (stew)
 Leicester pudding
 Lincoln biscuit
 Lincolnshire Poacher (cheese)
 Lincolnshire sausage
 Little Derby (cheese)
 London bun

M 
 Maidstone biscuit
 Malvern pudding
 Manchester tart
 Manx Queenie (shellfish)
 Marauding Scot (dessert)
 Melton Mowbray pork pie
 Merseyside meat pie
 Moffat toffee

N 
 Newmarket sausage
 Norbury blue (cheese)
 Norfolk dumplings
 Norfolk plough pudding
 Northamptonshire cheese cake
 Nottingham pudding

O 
 Oxford marmalade
 Oxford sausage

P 
 Pontefract cakes

R 
 Red Leicester cheese
 Red Windsor cheese

S 
 Sage Derby cheese
 Sandwich
 Scotch pancake
 Scotch pie
 Scotch broth
 Scotch egg
 Scotch woodcock (egg dish)
 Selkirk bannock (bread)
 Shrewsbury cake
 Shropshire blue (cheese)
 Shropshire fidget pie
 Single Gloucester (cheese)
 Somerset Brie (cheese)
 Somerset Camembert (cheese)
 Somerset chicken
 Staffordshire beef steaks
 Staffordshire cheese
 Staffordshire oatcake
 Stichelton (cheese)
 Stilton cheese
 Stornoway black pudding
 Strathdon Blue (cheese)
 Suffolk buns
 Suffolk cakes
 Suffolk swimmers (dumplings)
 Suffolk fish pie
 Suffolk harvest cake
 Suffolk raisin roly-poly (dessert)
 Suffolk red cabbage
 Suffolk stew 
 Surrey lamb pie
 Sussex Pond Pudding (dessert)
 Swaledale cheese

T 
 Tewkesbury mustard
 Tintern (cheese)
 Tottenham cake
 Tymsboro' (Timsbury)  (cheese)
 Tyneside floddies (breakfast dish)

W 
 Welsh cake
 Welsh dragon pork sausage
 Welsh rabbit or rarebit (toast dish)
 Wensleydale cheese
 Worcester pearmain (apple)
 Worcestershire sauce

Y 
 Y Fenni (Abergavenny) cheese
 Yorkshire blue (cheese)
 Yorkshire Forced Rhubarb
 Yorkshire pudding (roast dinner accompaniment)

References